Yaana (meaning: Sail) is a novel written by novelist S.L. Bhyrappa, which has a story of two astronauts (a man and a woman) traveling in a spaceship to Proxima Centauri, the closest star to the earth which is around 4-6 light years away. The journey takes several decades. The novel focuses on scientific problems and human relationships when they are away from the earth. While generating oxygen and food on the spaceship the technical problems, the other issues are giving birth to children there and nurturing them.

References

Kannada novels
2014 Indian novels
Fiction set around Proxima Centauri
Novels by S. L. Bhyrappa